The Standard Bank of Malawi, previously known as the Commercial Bank of Malawi, is a commercial bank in Malawi. It is licensed by the Reserve Bank of Malawi, the central bank and national banking regulator.

Location
The headquarters of Standard Bank Malawi are located in the Standard Bank Centre, African Unity Avenue, Lilongwe 3, in Malawi's capital city.

Overview
Standard Bank Malawi is a large financial services provider, serving the banking needs of large companies, small and medium enterprises, as well as individuals. As of December 2019, the bank's total assets were valued at MWK:375.26 billion (US$519 million), with shareholders' equity of MWK:87.24 billion (US$121 million).

History
The bank was established in Malawi on 15 March 1969, as Commercial Bank of Malawi. The founding shareholders were (a) the government of Malawi (b) Press Holdings Limited and (c) Banco Pinto & Sotto Mayor. By the mid 1980s, the bank became a wholly Malawian enterprise, with shareholders being (a) Malawian Development Corporation (20 percent) (b) Press Holdings (40 percent) (c) Government of Malawi (30 percent) and (d) Admarc (10 percent). In 1998, the government of Malawi sold its 30 percent shareholding by floating the bank's stock on the Malawi Stock Exchange (MSE).

In 2001, Standard Bank, a large South African financial services conglomerate, acquired 60  percent shareholding in Commercial Bank of Malawi (CBM). Initially the name of the bank changed to Stanbic Bank Malawi and on 1 June 2007 to Standard Bank Malawi.

Ownership 
The shares of stock of Standard Bank Malawi are listed on the Malawi Stock Exchange where they trade under the symbol STANDARD. As of 31 December 2018, the major shareholders in the bank were as listed in the table below.

Branches
As of May 2020, the bank maintained networked branches at the following locations.

Governance
The chairman of the ten-person Board of Directors is Dr Ngeyi Kanyongolo. The managing director and CEO is Phillip Madinga.

See also

References

External links
 Website of Standard Bank Malawi
 Foreign Managers Cause Havoc At Standard Bank Malawi As of 9 March 2018.
Standard Bank Malawi Takes Back Kubwalo-Chaika - K1.3bn Payout Package Scares Bank As of 9 November 2018.

Banks of Malawi
Banks established in 1969
Companies listed on Malawi Stock Exchange
1969 establishments in Malawi
Lilongwe
Standard Bank Group